

The Ullmann 2000 Panther is an American four-seat high-wing cabin monoplane designed by Ullmann Aircraft Company of Wichita, Kansas to be sold as kits for Amateur construction.

Design and development
The design of the Panther began in 1997 with construction of the prototype starting in Jun 1998, this prototype registered N202KT first flew on 29 March 2003. The Panther is a high-wing cantilever monoplane with an all-metal wing and a steel-tube fuselage covered with aluminum sheet. The prototype is powered by a  Continental IO-550-L engine driving a three-bladed constant-speed tractor propeller. The Panther has a tricycle landing gear and an enclosed cabin for a pilot and three passengers, side-by-side in two rows, access by split doors on each side of the fuselage and a small baggage door.

Specifications (Prototype)

References

Notes

Bibliography

2000s United States civil utility aircraft
Homebuilt aircraft
Single-engined tractor aircraft
High-wing aircraft
Aircraft manufactured in the United States
Aircraft first flown in 2003